Cyperus deciduus is a species of sedge that is endemic to central parts of Africa.

The species was first formally described by the botanist Johann Otto Boeckeler in 1879.

See also 
 List of Cyperus species

References 

deciduus
Taxa named by Johann Otto Boeckeler
Plants described in 1879
Flora of Angola
Flora of Zimbabwe